Robyn Mason Dawes (July 23, 1936 – December 14, 2010) was an American psychologist who specialized in the field of human judgment. His research interests included human irrationality, human cooperation, intuitive expertise, and the United States AIDS policy. He applied linear models to human decision making, including models with equal weights, a method known as unit-weighted regression.  He co-wrote an early textbook on mathematical psychology (see below).

Early life and education
Dawes earned his B.A. in Philosophy at Harvard (1958) and his Master’s in Clinical Psychology (1960) at the University of Michigan before earning his Doctorate in Mathematical Psychology (1963) at the same institution.

Career
Dawes held jobs at the University of Oregon, where he served as Department Head for five years, as well as the Oregon Research Institute.

In 1985, Dawes joined the Department of Social and Decision Sciences (SDS) at Carnegie Mellon University where he served as Department Head for six years eventually becoming the Charles J. Queenan, Jr. University Professor of Psychology. He was a fellow in the American Academy of Arts and Sciences and a member of the National Research Council's Committee on AIDS Research.

In 1990, he was awarded the William James Award by the American Psychological Association for the book Rational Choice in an Uncertain World, now in its 2nd Edition, which he co-wrote with Reid Hastie.

In 1994, Dawes wrote a book called House of Cards and one of the topics he discusses in this book is the comparison of results between non-professionals and professionals.

In 2006, Dawes was elected a Fellow of the American Statistical Association "for creative research on statistics and rational decision-making, contributions to the application of cognitive psychology to survey research, and promotion of careful statistical thinking in psychology and behavioral research."  He was a member of the American Psychological Association Ethics Committee.

Books

Selected publications
Dana, J., & Dawes, R. M. (2004). The superiority of simple alternatives to regression for social science predictions. Journal of Educational and Behavioral Statistics, volume 29(3), pages 317-331. 
Dawes, R. M. (1962). A note on base rates and psychometric efficiency. Journal of Consulting Psychology, volume 26(5), pages 422-424.
Dawes, R. M. (1976). Shallow psychology. In J. S. Carroll & J. W. Payne (Eds.), Cognition and social behavior (pages 3–12). Hillsdale, NJ: Lawrence Erlbaum.
Dawes, R. M. (1980). Social dilemmas. Annual Review of Psychology, volume 31, pages 169-193. 
Dawes, R. M. (1988). Proper and improper linear models. In R. M. Dawes (Ed.), Rational Choice in an Uncertain World (pages 201-227). Orlando, Florida: Harcourt Brace Jovanovich.
Dawes, R. M., Faust, D., Meehl, P. E. (1989). Clinical versus actuarial judgment. Science, volume 243(4899), pages 1668-1674. doi: 10.1126/science.2648573.  
Howard, J. W., & Dawes, R. M. (1976). Linear prediction of marital happiness. Personality and Social Psychology Bulletin, volume 2(4), pages 478-480.
Swets, J. A., Dawes, R. M., & Monahan, J. (2000, October). Better decisions through science. Scientific American, pages 82–87.

References

External links

 Robyn Dawes' web page at Carnegie Mellon University
 Obituary at Carnegie Mellon University

American women psychologists
2010 deaths
Carnegie Mellon University faculty
1936 births
Harvard College alumni
Fellows of the American Academy of Arts and Sciences
Fellows of the American Statistical Association
University of Michigan alumni
University of Oregon faculty